The Robarge-Desautels Apartment House is a historic multi-unit residence at 54 North Champlain Street in Burlington, Vermont.  Built about 1900, it is a well-preserved example of a Queen Anne style apartment house.  It was listed on the National Register of Historic Places in 2014.

Description and history
The Robarge-Desautels Apartment House stands on the east side of North Champlain Street in Burlington's Old North End neighborhood, a short way south of its junction with North Street.  It is a long rectangular -story wood-frame structure, with a gabled roof augmented by long shed-roof dormers to provide a full living space in the attic level.  Its vernacular Queen Anne features include gabled bracketed hoods over two of its entrances, which flank a central projecting polygonal bay.  That bay is capped by a gable that projects beyond the corners of the bay.  Along the right side there are two porches, one set above the entrance to the third-floor unit, the other two stories at the rear.  In between is a polygonal bay.

The apartment house was built about 1900, during a building boom caused by Burlington's rapidly increasing demand for workers in its burgeoning lumber-related industries.  It was built by John Robarge, a blacksmith who built several properties on North Champlain and nearby streets in an area that had formerly been a private estate.  He used the building as a rental property, and in 1921 his widow sold it to Wilfred and Clara Desautels, who occupied one of its units for thirty years.

See also
National Register of Historic Places listings in Chittenden County, Vermont

References

Residential buildings on the National Register of Historic Places in Vermont
National Register of Historic Places in Burlington, Vermont
Queen Anne architecture in Vermont
Residential buildings completed in 1900